New Era is a 2012 studio album by the Swedish metal band Cloudscape. It is the first album to feature the band's new lineup: Fredrik Joakimsson (drums), Håkan Nyander (bass) and Stefan Rosqvist (guitar). Two music videos (Your Desire and Before Your Eyes) were released to promote New Era. On the song "Share Your Energy", drummer Peter Wildoer guests on growls.

Personnel
Mike Andersson - Lead & Backing Vocals
Stefan Rosqvist - Guitars (Daniel Pålsson on album)
Patrik Svärd - Guitars
Håkan Nyander - Bass & Backing Vocals
Fredrik Joakimsson - Drums & Percussion

References

External links 
 

2012 albums
Cloudscape albums